Tierz is a municipality in the province of Huesca, Spain. As of 2010, it has a population of 691 inhabitants.

Main sights 
 Church of Nuestra Señora de la Asunción
 Hermitage of Nuestra Señora de los Dolores

External links 

Municipalities in the Province of Huesca